Péter Kovács (born October 1, 1971) is a Hungarian politician, current Mayor of the 16th district of Budapest since 2006.

Kovács also represented District XVI (Budapest Constituency XXIV) in the National Assembly of Hungary between 2010 and 2014. He was a member of the Committee on Sports and Tourism from May 14, 2010 to May 5, 2014.

Personal life
He is married and has three children.

References

1971 births
Living people
Fidesz politicians
Members of the National Assembly of Hungary (2010–2014)
Mayors of places in Hungary
Politicians from Budapest